The Wadjiga people, also known as Wadja, Maudalgo, Wadjainggo, and other variants, were an Aboriginal Australian people of inland eastern Queensland.

Country
Wadja tribal lands covered some  along the streams flowing along the eastern side of the Expedition Range. Their southern boundaries reached as far as Bigge Range. To the east they ran to the vicinity of the Dawson River. They were the Indigenous inhabitants of Woorabinda.

History
According to traditional lore, the Wadjiga arose from a confluence of two distinct tribes, namely the Wainjigo and the Wadja. Long cohabitation over the same tribal grounds led to the effective amalgamation of their separate identities and customs. Norman Tindale

Language

The Wajigu language is a dialect of the Bidjara language group.

Alternative names
 Wainjago, Wainjigo
 Wadjainggo
 Wainggo
Wadju, Maudalgo, Wadjainggo, Waindjago, Wainggo, Wainjago, Wainjigo, Wadya

Notes

Citations

Sources

Aboriginal peoples of Queensland